Crenshaw County School District  is a school district in Crenshaw County, Alabama. The three schools in the district are Brantley High School, Highland Home School, Luverne High School.

External links
 

School districts in Alabama